Wayne County is a county located in the U.S. state of Mississippi. As of the 2020 census, the population was 19,779. Its county seat is Waynesboro. The county is named for General Anthony Wayne.

Geography
It is the fifth-largest county in Mississippi by land area.

Major highways
  U.S. Highway 45
  U.S. Highway 84
  Mississippi Highway 63

Adjacent counties
 Clarke County (north)
 Choctaw County, Alabama (northeast)
 Washington County, Alabama (southeast)
 Greene County (south)
 Perry County (southwest)
 Jones County (west)
 Jasper County (northwest)

National protected area
 De Soto National Forest (part)

Demographics

2020 census

As of the 2020 United States Census, there were 19,779 people, 7,683 households, and 5,390 families residing in the county.

2000 census
As of the census of 2000, there were 21,216 people, 7,857 households, and 5,853 families living in the county.  The population density was 26 people per square mile (10/km2).  There were 9,049 housing units at an average density of 11 per square mile (4/km2).  The racial makeup of the county was 61.29% White, 38.01% Black, 0.07% Native American, 0.15% Asian, 0.01% Pacific Islander, 0.13% from other races, and 0.33% from two or more races.  0.63% of the population were Latino of any race.

There were 7,857 households, out of which 37.70% had children under the age of 18 living with them, 53.00% were married couples living together, 17.20% had a female householder with no husband present, and 25.50% were non-families. 23.10% of all households were made up of individuals, and 9.70% had someone living alone who was 65 years of age or older.  The average household size was 2.67 and the average family size was 3.15.

In the county, the population was spread out, with 29.20% under the age of 18, 9.70% from 18 to 24, 27.60% from 25 to 44, 21.70% from 45 to 64, and 11.70% who were 65 years of age or older.  The median age was 34 years. For every 100 females there were 91.50 males.  For every 100 females age 18 and over, there were 87.70 males.

The median income for a household in the county was $25,918, and the median income for a family was $30,513. Males had a median income of $27,139 versus $16,680 for females. The per capita income for the county was $12,757.  About 21.40% of families and 25.40% of the population were below the poverty line, including 32.70% of those under age 18 and 21.90% of those age 65 or over.

Communities

Cities
 Waynesboro (county seat)

Towns
 State Line

Census-designated places
 Buckatunna
 Chicora
 Clara
 Robinsons Junction (or Robinson's Junction)

Unincorporated communities
 Eret
 Matherville
 Eucutta

Ghost towns
 Winchester

Politics

See also
 National Register of Historic Places listings in Wayne County, Mississippi

References

External links
 Wayne County Sheriff's Office

 
Mississippi counties
1809 establishments in Mississippi Territory
Populated places established in 1809